Robert John Godfrey (born 30 July 1947) is a British composer, pianist and a founding member of The Enid.

Early career
Born on the Leeds Castle estate in Kent, England, Godfrey was privately educated in various prep schools prior to going to Finchden Manor in Tenterden, which was described by its founder George Lyward as a "therapeutic community for adolescents", other alumni of which included Alexis Korner and Tom Robinson. Although he didn't start to play the piano until the age of twelve, Godfrey's talent was prodigious enough to gain him admission to the Royal College of Music, then the Royal Academy of Music. He studied under concert pianist Malcolm Binns, and those around him included Sir Michael Tippett, Benjamin Britten and Hans Werner Henze.

Career
From 1968 to 1971 Godfrey became resident musical director with Barclay James Harvest, making musical contributions to early recordings which established their full, orchestral style of rock music. The relationship fell apart and accounts differ as to why. Godfrey is gay, and claimed this was one reason he was fired from BJH. "It was the band’s girlfriends who forced the issue," he told Classic Rock magazine. "They were from the Lancashire/Yorkshire area and couldn’t handle the idea of a gay man like me with a plummy accent." Years later Godfrey filed a lawsuit alleging he was owed composing credits and corresponding royalties on several of Barclay James Harvest's songs. He established that he had made a significant and original contribution to the creation of the works and must be regarded as a joint author. But as he had waited 14 years before asserting his rights, he was estopped from revoking the implied license granted to Lees for the exploitation of the works.

In 1974 the Charisma Records label released his first solo album, Fall of Hyperion. It had abysmal sales and Godfrey himself has since described it as "stupid".

He then went on to form The Enid.

Godfrey was the winner of the Visionary award at the 2014 Progressive Music Awards.

He has been diagnosed with Alzheimer's disease. In 2016, he retired from playing with The Enid due to his illness. His last regular performance with the band took place on 2 April 2016. However, in June 2017, it was announced that Godfrey would be joining The Enid in August of that year to celebrate his 70th birthday with a one-off performance at the Union Chapel in London, that took place on 5 August.

Discography
Fall of Hyperion (1974) (CAS 1084)
The Music of William Arkle (1986)
Reverberations (1987)
The Seed and the Sower (with Steve Stewart) (1988) (later reissued as by The Enid)
The Story of The Enid (1989)
The Art of Melody (2013)

"Fall of Hyperion" track listing
 "The Raven" (8:46)
 "Mountains" (6:56)
 "Water Song" (5:57)
 "End of Side 1" (0:04)
 "Isault" (5:10)
 "The Daemon Of The World" (14:44)
 "The Arrival Of The Phoenix"
 "Across The Abyss"
 "'The Daemon"
 "The Wanderer"
 "IHS"
 "Tuba Mirum"

Personnel
 Robert John Godfrey - keyboards
 Christopher Lewis - vocals
 Neil Tetlow - bass
 Jim Scott - guitars
 Tristan Fry - percussion
 Ronnie McCrea - percussion
 Nigel Morton - Hammond organ

References

1947 births
Living people
People from Leeds, Kent
Alumni of the Royal College of Music
Alumni of the Royal Academy of Music
Musicians from Kent
English gay musicians
The Enid members
20th-century LGBT people
21st-century LGBT people